The character of Polish women is shaped by Poland's history, culture, and politics. Poland has a long history of feminist activism, and was one of the first nations in Europe to enact women's suffrage. It is also strongly influenced by the conservative social views of the Catholic Church.

History 

The history of women on the territory of present-day Poland has many roots, and has been strongly influenced by Roman Catholicism in Poland. Feminism in Poland has a long history, and has traditionally been divided into seven periods, beginning arguably with the 18th-century Enlightenment, followed by first-wave feminism. The first four early periods coincided with the foreign partitions of Poland, which resulted in the elimination of the sovereign Polish state for 123 years.

1918–1939 
Poland was among the first nations to grant women legal rights: women's suffrage was enacted in 1918 after the country regained independence that year, following the 123-year period of partition and foreign rule. In 1932 Poland made marital rape illegal. Despite the improvement of the state's policies regarding women's rights, Polish women still faced discrimination on various levels. The concept of the "glass ceiling" in Polish society was formed during the interwar period. Women had to compete with men mainly for well-paid, high-prestige positions. Lower salaries were primarily a result of female employees' lower efficiency in physical labor but were later implemented in other sectors, where women were equally productive.

Communism 
During the communist era, women were ostensibly granted equal legal rights, and the official government rhetoric was one of supporting gender equality,as in other communist states. Women saw significant gains under the communist régime, such as better access to education and more equal involvement in the workforce. The improvement to women's conditions during the communist era was significantly influenced by the socialist pro-birth position, seeking an increase in the population. Pro-natalist policies were implemented by "generous maternity leave benefits and state contributions to child rearing". After martial law in Poland, the first publications discussing feminist ideas appeared in the public sphere, which were sometimes considered cover for the actual social situation. Society mainly perceived feminism as an ideology alien to the Polish culture and mentality. Communist leaders claimed that women in Poland obtained equal rights as a result of socialistic social processes, and used that statement to explain why there was a lack of – and no need for – feminism in Poland.

Post-communism 
The fall of communism in Poland meant the shaking up of the country's politics and economy, as well as initial economic and social destabilization. In the post-socialist workforce, women occupied mainly sectors of lower economic priority and light industry, due to factors such as selecting for types of education and training more compatible with family life (usually paid less), discrimination and gender stereotypes. This pattern of gender employment inequality was viewed by the majority as the result of women's primary role in the family, as well as deeply rooted Polish culture and the tradition of the patriarchal system. The transition period was especially difficult for women, although men were also negatively affected. As of 2017, the employment rate for women aged 20–64 was 63.6%, compared to men's rate of 78.2%. Although Poland has the image of a conservative country, often depicted as such in Western media, it actually has high numbers of professional women and women in business, and it also has one of the lowest gender pay gaps in the European Union. One of the obstacles faced by contemporary women in Poland is the anti-abortion law. Together with the figure of the "Polish Mother", abortion restrictions are used to encourage women to have many children. This ideology reinforces the view that women's place is in the home. The Polish Mother symbol is a stereotype strongly cemented in the Polish consciousness and which was shaped by the turbulent history of the nation. During the long occupation, the responsibility for maintaining national identity fell on mothers, whose main task was the "upbringing of children". Despite the strict legislation and conservative political discourse, Poland has one of the lowest fertility rates in Europe.

The status of women in contemporary Poland must be understood in the context of the political scene and of the role that the church plays in society. This is especially true with regard to reproductive rights. Poland is a country strongly influenced by Roman Catholicism, and religion often shapes politics and social views. Law and Justice, abbreviated PiS, is a national-conservative, and Christian democratic political party in Poland. With 237 seats in the Sejm and 66 in the Senate, it is currently the largest party in the Polish parliament.

Poland has been part of the European Union (EU) since 2004. As such, it is subject to EU directives. As part of the EU, Poland is socially influenced by 'Western' views, but there are regional differences between the western and the eastern parts of the country – "Poland A and B". Poland also has a significant rural population: about 40%, which is deeply conservative.

Old Polish customs 
Old Polish customs differed based on social status. Polish customs derived from other European traditions, however, typically came to Poland later than in other countries. The example of chivalry illustrates the approach of the medieval class towards women. The entire idea of chivalry was based on the almost divine worship of the female, and every knight had to have his "lady" as the object of (very often platonic) love. Knights felt obligated to take a patronage over their ladies. Women in Poland were historically perceived as the soul of the company during social gatherings. Woman traditionally held a preeminent social position. Long before the emancipation movement, women in Poland had an important social role mainly due to the numerous conflicts and threats that kept men away from home. The political and economic situation required women to become self-sufficient and courageous. Polish women's clothing was also quite different in the past. Mid-16th century apparel contained a variety of types of decorations and accessories. Women's headwear included decorative wreaths, veils, and various hatbands. Among the notable elements of women's clothing of the time were "long, satin dresses" decorated with gold and pearls, as well as "aureate slippers".

Women in sports 
Polish women have earned a special place in the country's sports. The top three places for the most wins in the annual most popular sportsperson contest, the Plebiscite of Przegląd Sportowy, are occupied by women. Among the most prominent Polish women athletes are Justyna Kowalczyk (won the title five times in a row), Irena Szewińska (three times in a row) and Stanisława Walasiewicz (three times in a row, four times total). Iga Świątek was voted the Polish Sports Personality of the Year in 2023. In the 2016 Rio Summer Olympics Poland was represented by 101 women athletes. They won eight out of eleven medals for Poland, including two gold medals.

Notable women in Polish history 

Important women in early Polish history include Swietoslava (sometimes confused for Sigrid the Haughty or Gunhilda; also known as Storrada), the daughter of Mieszko the First and Dobrawa of Bohemia; Katarzyna Jagiellonka (also known as Catherine Jagiello or Katarrina Jegellonica); Dobrawa herself (wife of Mieszko I), the daughter of the Duke of Bohemia; Queen Jadwiga (Hedwig), the daughter of a Hungarian king and Barbara Radziwiłł, Queen of Poland and consort of Sigismund II Augustus, the last male monarch of the Jagiellonian dynasty. During the Enlightenment, two women stand out: Barbara Sanguszko, hostess, writer and philanthropist and her granddaughter, Tekla Teresa Lubienska, writer and mother of a magnate dynasty. Emilia Plater was an early revolutionary associated with the November Uprising. In music, the composer and pianist Maria Szymanowska won acclaim from Saint Petersburg to London. Marie Sklodowska was a Nobel Prize-winning scientist who moved to France in the late 19th century. Gabriela Zapolska, Eliza Orzeszkowa, Maria Dąbrowska, Zofia Nałkowska, Maria Pawlikowska-Jasnorzewska and Zuzanna Ginczanka are considered important female figures in Polish 19th and 20th-century literature. Many notable women contributed to Poland's independence movement at the dawn of the 20th century. These included the activist and military officer Aleksandra Zagórska, World War II secret agent Krystyna Skarbek and the mostly forgotten Wanda Gertz, as well as Anna Walentynowicz, co-founder of the anti-communist Solidarity. Wisława Szymborska was a Polish poet and recipient of the Nobel Prize in 1996. Prominent Polish female artists include Olga Boznańska, Anna Bilińska, Tamara de Lempicka, Zofia Stryjeńska, Magdalena Abakanowicz and Alina Szapocznikow.

Abortion in Poland 

In 2020 Poland's constitutional court ruled that abortion due to fetal defects was unconstitutional.

As of 2023, abortion in Poland is legal in cases of rape and when the woman's life or any form of health is in jeopardy.

Gallery

See also 
 Gender roles in post-communist Central and Eastern Europe

References

Specific

General

External links 
 ‘Polszczyzna’ & the Revolutionary Feminine Suffix 

 
Poland